This is a list of adult fiction books that topped The New York Times Fiction Best Seller list in 1948.

The American publisher Bennett Cerf noted that there had been "only three novels published [in 1948] that were worth reading ... Cry, The Beloved Country, The Ides of March, and The Naked and the Dead." Only Cry did not top the list that year. A total of ten other novels did, however, with most titles spending only a few weeks at the top. The strongest performing title was The Naked and the Dead, Norman Mailer's first best seller, published when he was just 25 years old, which spent 19 weeks at Number 1 and more than 6 months in the top 10. It was the first "big" novel about World War II, based on his own experiences. The Ides of March was by Thornton Wilder and it spent 2 weeks at Number 1 but only 13 weeks in the top 15. The year ended with The Big Fisherman heading the list, Lloyd C. Douglas's follow-up to his huge 1942 best seller, The Robe.

See also
 Publishers Weekly list of bestselling novels in the United States in the 1940s

References

1948
.
1948 in the United States